Uebelmannia pectinifera is a species of plant in the family Cactaceae. It is endemic to Brazil.  Its natural habitats are dry savanna and rocky areas. It is threatened by habitat loss.

Description
Uebelmannia pectinifer is a solitary and globular species, becoming columnar with age, grows with dark reddish-brown to greyish, more or less cylindrical bodies that reach heights of growth of up to 100 centimeters and a diameter of up to 15 centimeters. The epidermis usually appears granular and is covered with waxy white scales. The 15 to 40 ribs are sharp-edged. The brownish to gray felty areoles on it are very close together. The 1 to 4 brown to almost black spines are protruding, often intertwine and then form a "comb". They are up to 2 centimeters long.

The slender, funnel-shaped, light yellow flowers that bloom diurnal in the summer, up to 1.5 centimeters long and reach a diameter of 1 centimeter. The pear-shaped to cylindrical fruits are purple-red and 1.5 to 2.5 centimeters long,the seeds are small and black.

Subspecies

References

External links

Flora of Brazil
Uebelmannia
Least concern plants
Taxonomy articles created by Polbot